SN 2007bi was an extremely energetic supernova discovered early in 2007 by the international Nearby Supernova Factory based at the U.S. Department of Energy's Lawrence Berkeley National Laboratory. The precursor star is estimated to have had 200 solar masses at the time of its formation and around 100 solar masses in its core when it went supernova. The explosion ejected more than 22 solar masses of silicon and other heavy elements into space during this supernova including more than 6 solar masses of radioactive nickel which caused the expanding gases to glow very brightly for many months. 

The supernova has been described as an unambiguous fit for the pair-instability supernova model.

References
 SIMBAD data

Further reading

External links
 Light curves and spectra on the Open Supernova Catalog
 New Scientist, "Death of rare giant star sheds light on cosmic past" 
 Science Daily, "Superbright Supernova Is First of Its Kind" 
 Keck Observatory, "First of its kind superbright supernova" 
 Nature, "Full report submitted by scientists to the journal Nature" 
 Weizmann Institute, "First hand description of the study" 

Supernovae
20070406
Virgo (constellation)